Bukonla Adebakin is a Nigerian business executive and speaker. She is the Group Chief Operations Officer of RED for Africa. She is also the team lead for The Future Project which organizes The Future Awards Africa.

Education 
Adebakin is a graduate in Science and Technology Education from the University of Lagos, Nigeria.

References 

University of Lagos alumni
Nigerian women business executives
Year of birth missing (living people)
Living people